Valley Road Bridge, Stewartstown Railroad is a historic railroad bridge in Hopewell Township, York County, Pennsylvania. Built for the Northern Central Railroad in 1870, the 190 foot long bridge was disassembled and reassembled on the Stewartstown Railroad in 1885. A girder structure was added in 1920, and the original bridge structure was removed, although the original 1870 trusses are still in place. The bridge is still in active use, and services the Stewartstown Railroad passenger excursions.

It was added to the National Register of Historic Places in 1995.

See also
List of bridges documented by the Historic American Engineering Record in Pennsylvania

References

External links

Railroad bridges on the National Register of Historic Places in Pennsylvania
Bridges completed in 1885
Bridges in York County, Pennsylvania
Historic American Engineering Record in Pennsylvania
National Register of Historic Places in York County, Pennsylvania
Pratt truss bridges in the United States
Metal bridges in the United States
1870 establishments in Pennsylvania